Stypommisa punctipennis is a species of horse flies in the family Tabanidae.

Distribution
Brazil, Argentina.

References

Tabanidae
Taxa named by Günther Enderlein
Diptera of South America
Insects described in 1923